A valediction (derivation from Latin vale dicere, "to say farewell"), or complimentary close in American English, is an expression used to say farewell, especially a word or phrase used to end a letter or message, or a speech made at a farewell.

Valediction's counterpart is a greeting called a salutation.

English
Valedictions normally immediately precede the signature in written correspondence. The word or words used express respect, esteem, or regard for the person to whom the correspondence is directed, and the exact form used depends on a number of factors.

In British English, valedictions have largely been replaced by the use of "Yours sincerely" or "Yours faithfully". "Yours sincerely" is typically employed in English when the recipient is addressed by name (e.g. "Dear John") and is known to the sender to some degree, whereas "Yours faithfully" is used when the recipient is not addressed by name (i.e., the recipient is addressed by a phrase such as "Dear Sir/Madam") or when the recipient is not known personally by the sender.

Formal usage
Historically, valedictions were often elaborate and formal. Vestiges of such formality remain in various cases. The examples below are subject to some variation, but generally follow the pattern described.

United Kingdom
Letters to the King of the United Kingdom should end, "I have the honour to remain, Sir, Your Majesty’s most humble and obedient servant." Alternatively, "I remain, with the profoundest veneration, your Majesty's most faithful subject and dutiful servant."
Letters to other members of the Royal Family should end, "I have the honour to remain, Sir/Madam, Your Royal Highness’s most humble and obedient servant."
Letters to ambassadors should end, "I have the honour to be, with the highest consideration, Your Excellency’s obedient servant."
Letters to high commissioners should end, "I have the honour to be Your Excellency’s obedient servant."
Letters to the pope should end, "I have the honour to be, Your Holiness’s most devoted and obedient child." (substituting "obedient servant" if not a Roman Catholic).
Letters to a cardinal should end, "I have the honour to be, My Lord Cardinal, Your Eminence's devoted and obedient child." (substituting "obedient servant" if not a Roman Catholic).
Letters to an archbishop should end, "I have the honour to be Your Grace's devoted and obedient child." (substituting "obedient servant" if not a Roman Catholic).
Letters to a bishop should end, "I have the honour to be Your Lordship's obedient child." (substituting "obedient servant" if not a Roman Catholic).
Letters to an abbot should end, "I beg to remain, my Lord Abbot, your devoted and obedient servant."

Business usage in the United States
The following table contains complimentary closings as recommended for business hard-letter use by two American authorities: Barron's Educational Series and American Management Association.

Diplomatic usage
A diplomatic note verbale always ends with an elaborate valediction, most commonly "[Sender] avails itself of this opportunity to renew to [recipient] the assurances of its highest consideration".

Valedictions in e-mail
Valedictions in formal e-mail are similar to valedictions in letters; on the whole, they are variations of "regards" and "yours". However, a wide range of popular valedictions are used in casual e-mail but very rarely in letters.

Other forms
"Yours aye" is a Scottish expression meaning "Yours always", still commonly used as a valediction to end written correspondence in the Royal Navy and British Army, and occasionally used by sailors or people working in a maritime context. It is commonly used in the Royal Australian Navy as a sign-off in written communication such as emails. 
"Yours, etc." is used historically for abbreviated endings. It can be found in older newspaper letters to the editor, and often in US legal correspondence. "&c." may be seen as an alternative abbreviation of et cetera, the ampersand functioning as a ligature form of "et". "I am, etc." and "I remain, etc." are also used.
"Yours hopefully" is occasionally used in letters of respect or complaint.

United States military usage
Current regulations of the United States Department of Defense, the Joint Chiefs of Staff, the U.S. Air Force, the U.S. Army, and the U.S. Navy call for two complimentary closings for letters: "Respectfully yours" and "Sincerely". "Respectfully yours" is reserved for the president (and, for the Army only, the president's spouse) and the president-elect. "Sincerely" is used in all other cases.

For more informal (but still professional) correspondence among military service members, "Respectfully" and "Very Respectfully" are used. These are often abbreviated as "R" and "V/R." "Respectfully" is addressed to those of lower rank and "Very Respectfully" is addressed to those of the same rank or above.

The Commander of the Navy's school in the military's Mustang University stated his preference, in 2014, that the older "Very respectfully" be used in letters to someone senior in pay-grade or positional authority. However, the commander acknowledged that current regulations call for "Sincerely" and told students they were free to follow that practice.

Bengali
In written form, valediction is very important in Bengali. When writing official letters, general customs are:
  . 
  .

In oral form, various forms are used
, from Persian, literal meaning: 'May God be your Guardian' (primarily Bengali Muslims).
, from Persian, literal meaning: 'May Allah be your Guardian' (primarily among Bengali Muslims).
, from Sanskrit, literal meaning: 'I bow to the divine in you' (primarily among Bengali Hindus).

Chinese
Valedictions in Chinese are highly variable and reflect the relative social status of the sender and recipient.  Salutation is traditionally placed after valediction and the closing of the main body of the letter, as opposed to its typical location in English.  Traditional valediction include:
To social seniors:  (prostrating [to you], delivering up)、 (respectfully, speedily reporting)、 (especially prostrating, respectfully reporting)、 (prostrating [to you])、 (respectfully)、 (reverently)。
To social equals:  (especially, respectfully delivering)、 ([apologetically] quickly, relaying [my] estimations)、 (especially relaying [for your] information)、 ([apologetically] simply, respectfully delivering)、 (simply)、 (especially)。
For replications especially: 
For congratulations or commemoration: 
To or from mourning persons: 
For expression of gratitude:

French
Standard French language valedictions tend to be much more complex than standard English ones, more akin to older English valedictions. They show a fair degree of variation, for example:

 
 "Please accept,  Madam, Sir, the expression of my distinguished sentiments."

Or:

 
 "Please receive, Madam, my sincere salutations."

Or:

  
 "I beg you to believe, Sir, in my best sentiments."

In the latter case of a formula beginning with the first person, the valediction is often enhanced with a participial phrase concluding the sense of the letter (since traditionally it is not considered appropriate to begin a paragraph with the first person singular  in a letter):

 
 "Hoping for a favourable answer, I beg you to allow, Madam…"

A number of rules concern the use of these formulae:
 the title used in the salutation of the letter must be reproduced in the valediction; so a letter addressing  would conclude, .
 the wording  should be used in a letter from a hierarchical superior to an inferior, whereas the wording  should be used in a letter from a hierarchical inferior to a superior, and not conversely.
 in a letter from a man to a woman or from a woman to a man, the writer must not send  if they are not close family relatives (i.e. mother and son, father and daughter, brother and sister, or possibly close cousins).

Letters to dignitaries may use even more grandiose styles, such as:

 
 "Deign, Mr. Prime Minister, to allow the expression of my most distinguished consideration."

or more commonly:

 
 "Please accept, Mr. Prime Minister, the expression of my highest consideration."

According to French typographic rules, the proper capitalization for the official title is "Premier ministre" although people who mimic English titles or fear that they might appear disrespectful often use more capitals than the rules commend.

 
 "Please allow, Madam Ambassador, the expression of my most respectful salutations."

Much shorter styles may be used in brief notes, and informal letters (such as between intimates) may use expressions such as (with approximate English equivalents – not literal translations):

  ("In friendship")
  ("Your friend")
  ("See you soon")
  ("Hope to see you again soon")
  ("In Good Friendship")
  ("Sincerely yours")
  ("Cordially")
  ("Best Salutations")
  ("With Distinguished Salutations")

Unlike in English, when the letter writer has a title that is unique in his or her organization, it is placed before, not after, the name:

German
Valedictions in German, while a lot less complex than those in French, are similarly flexible. The highly formal form  (lit. 'highly respectfully') has been practically obsolete for many years and is very rarely used in modern German, except for highly formal correspondence from authorities or in letters with a highly negative connotation where "friendliness" would not be appropriate.

'with friendly regards') and is equivalent to Yours sincerely or Yours faithfully in English. Other semi-formal alternatives include (roughly in descending order of formality)  (lit. 'with best regards'),  (lit. 'with cordial regards'),  (lit. 'many regards'),  (lit. 'nice regards').

German valedictions also offer the possibility of adding your location, e.g.  to added effect. While this is no less formal, it does have a more "relaxed" feel to it. 'many regards from sunny Barcelona').

These valedictions are also often adapted to specific professions, states or political views. For example, it is common to use  ("with regards in solidarity") among socialist and communist groups,  (lit. 'with cooperative regards') among labour union members,  (lit.

Friends or close colleagues among each other may use simply .

It is possible in informal and rapid e-mail communication to sometimes use abbreviations of the forms, unlike in English. A popular form in Germany in recent years,  (lit. 'am very fond of you', for somewhere between "I like you" and "I love you") has found increased usage in SMS text messaging and e-mails in more intimate relationships.

'with German regards'), as it has National Socialist overtones.

Hebrew

Jews in the United States often use 'B'shalom' or 'shalom' within Jewish circles, for example, from a Rabbi to his congregation. This is an American Jewish usage, rarely heard from native speakers of modern Israeli Hebrew. 'B'shalom' is incorrect, as it is religiously tantamount to wishing death on someone. Indeed, the Talmud says: "In bidding farewell to the living one should not say, 'Go with peace' [lech b'shalom], but 'Go to peace' [lech l'shalom], because [King] David said to [his son] Absalom, 'Go with peace', and he went and was hanged; whereas Jethro said to Moses, 'Go to peace', and he went and succeeded." [Talmud, Moed Katan 29a]

Hungarian
 : Very formal and now dated, means "I respectfully remain (your servant)".
 : Very formal, means "With regards". This is the equivalent of the English "Yours sincerely/faithfully/truly".
 : Somewhat formal, assumes existing relationship. Often used between colleagues. It literally means "Greetings".
Very frequently used in e-mails among colleagues.
 : Informal and somewhat intimate, means "kiss on the cheek". Often used within family and among friends, between or toward women.
 : Intimate, it means "kiss (on the mouth)". Mostly used between couples.

Japanese
  ( – Sincerely)
  ( – With great humility)

Portuguese 
Formal valedictions should end with a comma followed by a paragraph where the valedictor's name (and optionally his status) is identified. Depending on the occasion, different degrees of formality are adequate, ranging from highly formal (e.g. solemn occasions) to totally informal (e.g. a conversation among friends). Some formal valedictions can be used at different formality degrees, but almost never in informal situations.

Highly formal valedictions
  ("With the best compliments")
  ("Respectfully")
  ("Reverently")
  ("With protestations of the highest esteem and consideration")

Formal valedictions
  ("Graciously")
  ("Attentively")
  ("Academic salutations", very common within Portuguese universities)

Semi-formal valedictions
  ("Cordially")
  ("With friendship")
  ("Regards")
  ("Cordial salutations")

Informal valedictions
  ("a hug", usually between men), also  ("hugs").
  (literally "a kisslet", very common especially between female and male friends), also  (literally "kisslets")
  ("I miss you verily")
  /  ("Yours": male/female valedictor)
  ("All the best")

Abbreviated valedictions (informal)

Russian 

 ((Very) respectfully yours) – most often used
 (Best regards) – allowed between long-time partners, otherwise sounds condescending
 (Sincerely yours) – a bit affectionate, e.g. a younger colleague addressing a senior one
 (yours)
 (Your obedient servant) – ironic; the least possible degree of formality between people not being close friends or socially equal
 (Please accept the assurances of my sincerest regards and respect) – diplomatic etiquette
 (See you soon) – informal

Slovak

 (Sincerely)
 (Yours truly) - very formal
 (Cordial greetings)
 (Take care)

Spanish

 (Regards)
 (literally "attentively", a very common business valediction similar to "respectfully")
 ("cordially")
 (literally "amiably", similar to "kindly")
 ("lovingly", not commonly used in Spain)
 ("tenderly", not commonly used in Spain)
 ("cordial greetings")
 ("receive cordial greetings")
 ("a hug", very common between male friends and male family members)
 ("hugs")
 ("a kiss", very common to and from female friends and family members)
 ("kisses")

Swedish 

  (Highly respectfully – Old style and very formal, no longer in common use)
  (With friendly regard – Common in business letters)
 or:  (With friendly regards)
 in informal emails often written: 
 or:  (Kindly)
  (Cordially – somewhat formal among friends, informal in business letters)
  (Hug – informal, between friends)

Turkish 

 (yours faithfully)
 (yours sincerely, or kind/best regards)
 (respectfully yours, or regards)

See also
 Business letter
 Salutation

References

External links

 AskOxford: French valedictions for English speakers

Writing
Parting traditions

fr:Politesse#Formules de politesse épistolaires